The 2013 MENA Golf Tour was the third season of the MENA Golf Tour.

Schedule
The following table lists official events during the 2013 season.

Order of Merit
The Order of Merit was based on prize money won during the season, calculated in U.S. dollars. Mustapha El Maouas led the amateur Order of Merit.

Notes

References

MENA Golf Tour